Patrick Schnieder (born 1 May 1968) is a German lawyer and politician of the Christian Democratic Union (CDU) who has been serving as a member of the Bundestag from the state of Rhineland-Palatinate since 2009.

Political career

Career in state politics
From 2011 until 2018, Schnieder served as Secretary General of the CDU in Rhineland-Palatinate, under the leadership of chairwoman Julia Klöckner. During his time in office, he managed the party's campaign for the 2016 state elections.

Member of the German Parliament, 2009–present
Schnieder first became a member of the Bundestag after the 2009 German federal election. He is a member of the Committee on Verification of Credentials and Immunities and the Committee on Transport and Digital Infrastructure.

In addition to his committee assignments, Schnieder has been chairing the German Parliamentary Friendship Group with Belgium and Luxembourg since 2014. He is also part of the German-Italian Parliamentary Friendship Group and the German-Japanese Parliamentary Friendship Group. Since 2019, he has been a member of the German delegation to the Franco-German Parliamentary Assembly.

Within the CDU/CSU parliamentary group, Schnieder has been leading the group of CDU parliamentarians from Rhineland-Palatinate since the 2017 elections. In the negotiations to form a coalition government under the leadership of Chancellor Angela Merkel following the elections, he was part of the working group on transport and infrastructure, led by Michael Kretschmer, Alexander Dobrindt and Sören Bartol.

Other activities 
 Federal Network Agency for Electricity, Gas, Telecommunications, Post and Railway (BNetzA), Alternate Member of the Advisory Board (since 2014)
 German Red Cross (DRK), Member
 Association of German Foundations, Member of the Parliamentary Advisory Board (2009-2017)

Political positions 
In June 2017, Schnieder voted against Germany’s introduction of same-sex marriage.

In 2019, Schnieder joined 14 members of his parliamentary group who, in an open letter, called for the party to rally around Angela Merkel and party chairwoman Annegret Kramp-Karrenbauer amid criticism voiced by conservatives Friedrich Merz and Roland Koch.

References

External links 

  
 Bundestag biography 

1968 births
Living people
Members of the Bundestag for Rhineland-Palatinate
Members of the Bundestag 2021–2025
Members of the Bundestag 2017–2021
Members of the Bundestag 2013–2017
Members of the Bundestag 2009–2013
Members of the Bundestag for the Christian Democratic Union of Germany